The Jacarandá River is a river of Espírito Santo state in eastern Brazil. It is a tributary of the Jucu River.

See also
List of rivers of Espírito Santo

References
Brazilian Ministry of Transport

Rivers of Espírito Santo